The Defterdar Mosque, or the Defterdar Mahmut Efendi Mosque, is 16th century Ottoman mosque located in Eyüp, Istanbul, Turkey. The original pair was broken by a storm in 1997. Ten years later, on 30 May 2007, a new inkpot and a pen assembled on top of the dome of the mosque.

Gallery

See also
 List of mosques
 Mimar Sinan
 Ottoman architecture

References

External links
 Image of the Defterdar Mosque in Eyüp
 Small set of pictures

Religious buildings and structures completed in 1542
16th-century mosques
Ottoman mosques in Istanbul
Mimar Sinan buildings
Eyüp
1542 establishments in the Ottoman Empire